Phu Dorjee Sherpa was the first Nepali man and twenty-third person in the world to climb Mount Everest. He was a member of the third Indian Everest Expedition 1965, led by Captain M S Kohli, which was the first successful Indian Everest Expedition. The group consisted of 21 major expedition members and 50 Sherpas. The initial attempt was at the end of April, when they returned to base camp due to bad weather and waited 2 weeks for better weather.

On 29 May 1965, on the fourth and final attempt on the 12th anniversary of the first conquest of Mount Everest, together with H. P. S. Ahluwalia and Harish Chandra Singh Rawat, Phu Dorjee summited Mount Everest. This was the first time that these three climbers climbed the mountain together.

He died in a fall on Mount Everest on 18 October 1969.

Awards
 Received the Padma Shri for being one of the first Indians to summit Mount Everest in 1965

See also
List of Mount Everest summiters by number of times to the summit
List of Mount Everest records of India
List of Mount Everest records

References

See also
List of Mount Everest summiters by number of times to the summit
List of 20th-century summiters of Mount Everest
List of Mount Everest records of India

Nepalese summiters of Mount Everest
Sherpa summiters of Mount Everest
Nepalese mountain climbers
1969 deaths
Mountaineering deaths
Recipients of the Padma Shri in sports